This is a summary of the electoral history of Margaret Thatcher, who served as Prime Minister of the United Kingdom from 1979 to 1990 and Leader of the Conservative Party from 1975 to 1990. She was the Member of Parliament (MP) for Finchley from 1959 to 1992.

Parliamentary elections

1950 general election, Dartford

1951 general election, Dartford

1959 general election, Finchley

1964 general election, Finchley

1966 general election, Finchley

1970 general election, Finchley

February 1974 general election, Finchley

October 1974 general election, Finchley

1979 general election, Finchley

1983 general election, Finchley

1987 general election, Finchley

Conservative Party leadership elections

1975 leadership election

1989 leadership election

1990 leadership election

United Kingdom general elections

1979 general election

1983 general election

1987 general election

Notes

References 

Thatcher, Margaret
Margaret Thatcher
Thatcher, Margaret